Yeh Hsien-hsiu (born 1 June 1948) is a Taiwanese politician and singer.

Music career
As a singer, he was known by the stage name Yeh Chi-tien. He won the 1996 Golden Melody Award for Best Song of the Year.

Political career
He was elected to the Legislative Yuan as a representative of Taipei County twice, between 1993 and 1996, then again from 1999 to 2002.

References

1948 births
Living people
Taiwanese Hokkien pop singers
Taiwanese singer-songwriters
20th-century Taiwanese male  singers
21st-century Taiwanese  male singers
Taiwanese people of Hoklo descent
Members of the 2nd Legislative Yuan
Members of the 4th Legislative Yuan
Politicians of the Republic of China on Taiwan from Chiayi County
New Taipei Members of the Legislative Yuan